Bone Marrow Transplantation is a peer-reviewed medical journal covering transplantation of bone marrow in humans. It is published monthly by Nature Research. The scope of the journal includes stem cell biology, transplantation immunology, translational research, and clinical results of specific transplant protocols. 

According to the Journal Citation Reports, Bone Marrow Transplantation has a 2020 impact factor of 5.483.

Abstracting and indexing 
Bone Marrow Transplantation is abstracted and indexed in BIOBASE/Current Awareness in Biological Sciences,  BIOSIS, Current Contents/Clinical Medicine, Current Contents/Life Sciences, EMBASE/Excerpta Medica, MEDLINE/Index Medicus, and Science Citation Index.

References

External links 
 

Publications established in 1986
Nature Research academic journals
Hematology journals
Oncology journals
English-language journals
Monthly journals
Organ transplantation journals